Farm land is a real estate niche that deals with the purchase and sale of Arable land.
This niche requires the real estate agent to have very particular knowledge about the land and farming industry.
A Real Estate agent or broker that specialises in farms must be knowledgeable in the following:  City, County and State regulations of farms. The agent must be familiar with P&L statements for farms.
Farm land can be very large: some farms are more than 100 acres.

The agent must be familiar with livestock farms and crop producing farms to determine the market value of the property.

Value of the property is determined with the expected return on investment of the farm business.
Farm machinery are often included as part of the transaction. In many cases, farm machinery are worth more than $1 million.

Farming transaction is very complex. There are few lenders available to finance a farm.

A state salesperson or brokers license is required to represent a seller or buyer.

A real estate salesperson or broker should have a minimum of 5 years experience working with an experience farm broker before soliciting for their own farm clients.

References

Real estate terminology